Holby is a fictional city in the United Kingdom, the setting for the BBC medical dramas Casualty and Holby City, and the police drama HolbyBlue. It is based on the real city of Bristol, where Casualty was formerly filmed, and is notionally located in the fictional county of Wyvern in South West England, not far from the border with Wales.  While Casualty has been filmed in Cardiff since 2011, Holby City is filmed in Elstree, Hertfordshire. Both shows are set in the same fictional Holby City Hospital. Holby has an airport called Holby International.

Holby City Hospital

Holby City Hospital is the fictional hospital within the city in which Casualty and Holby City are set. It is based on the Bristol Royal Infirmary which the original script writers spent time observing in the 1980s in order to garner ideas for Casualty. Although both shows are set in the same hospital, Casualty is primarily filmed in Cardiff, whilst Holby City is filmed in Hertfordshire at BBC Elstree Centre. The indoor shots for the first series of Casualty were filmed at BBC Television Centre in London.

It was announced on 15 October 2008 that the BBC was considering moving the filming of Casualty to studios in Cardiff. On 26 March 2009, the BBC confirmed the move. Since late 2011, Casualty has been filmed on a purpose built studio and backlot set at the BBC Roath Lock Studios in Cardiff Bay at
. The hospital became a NHS Foundation Trust in 2016.

Wards and departments
As of 2002, four main wards have formed the focus of storylines within the hospital.  In Casualty, the primary location is the hospital's Emergency Department (formerly referred to as Accident and Emergency), which has its own adjoining Clinical Decisions Unit, introduced in series 25. Holby City is set between the hospital's Acute Assessment Unit (ground floor), and Keller (third floor) and Darwin (sixth floor) wards, providing General and Cardiothoracic surgical care respectively. Holby expanded by adding "HolbyCare", a private healthcare ward led by Michael Spence adjacent to the existing Intensive Care Unit on the fifth floor. Former storylines have also focused around the hospital's Otter ward, providing pediatric care, as well as its maternity ward. Otter ward has not featured in the show since series 4, whilst the maternity ward ceased usage as a primary location in series 8. Obs & Gynae, Maternity and pediatrics are quite regularly mentioned. In 2004, Nightingale, a mothballed wing of the hospital, is used to perform a major heart transplant on a small girl by Connie Beauchamp and Harry Harper while the hospital burns.

In 2011, Downton and Perry are shown to be psychiatric wards at the hospital. (Series 25, Episode 23 "Place of Safety") Other wards of the hospital to be referenced in the series include Berkley, Clifton, Curie (disused), Florence, Geraint Morris, Hitchcock (psychiatric), Linnaeus, Swift and St Clares as well as the paediatric, neonatal, burns and neuro ICUs.

List of wards/departments

Holby Ambulance Service

Holby Ambulance Service is the fictional ambulance service which serves Holby City Hospital - also appearing in the two hospital dramas Casualty and Holby City. Although the ambulance service is only seen in Holby City very rarely, Casualty has featured paramedic characters as a key part of the cast since the show's 1986 conception.

Holby South
Holby South is the fictional police station in which HolbyBlue was based in its two series run.

St James' Hospital
St James is another hospital located on the other side of Holby likely based on Southmead Hospital to the north of Bristol city centre, and although not shown is referred to regularly. Other hospitals located in Holby which were referenced in the past include Queen's, St Luke's, St Francis', St Austin's and St Thomas'.

Trivia
Another fictional Holby is the setting for the Danish TV soap Ugeavisen ("The Weekly Paper"), made by the Danish Broadcasting Corporation (DR) and first shown in 52 weekly episodes in 1990-91. DR described this Holby as a "medium-sized provincial town, a good hour's drive from Copenhagen".

References

 
England in fiction
Fictional populated places in England